The Roman Catholic Diocese of Saint Joseph was an ecclesiastical territory or diocese of the Roman Catholic Church in the northwestern part of the state of Missouri in the United States, erected on March 3, 1868, with territories taken from the Archdiocese of Saint Louis.   Its first bishop was John Joseph Hogan.  On July 2, 1956, the diocese lost territory to the newly erected Diocese of Jefferson City and the Diocese of Springfield–Cape Girardeau. On that date it was united to the Diocese of Kansas City, which was renamed the Diocese of Kansas City–Saint Joseph.

Bishops

Bishops of Saint Joseph
John Joseph Hogan (1868–1880); appointed Bishop of Kansas City but continued here as Apostolic Administrator, 1880–1893
Maurice Francis Burke (1893–1923); died
Francis Gilfillan (1923–1933); died
Charles Hubert Le Blond (1933–1956); resigned

Coadjutor bishop
Francis Gilfillan (1922-1923)

Other priests of this diocese who became bishops
Francis Johannes, appointed Coadjutor Bishop of Leavenworth in 1927
Charles Francis Buddy, appointed Bishop of San Diego in 1936

Resources
Diocese of Kansas City–Saint Joseph
Catholic Hierarchy Profile of the Diocese of Saint Joseph
Article in the Catholic Encyclopedia

Saint Joseph
Former Roman Catholic dioceses in America
History of Missouri
Religious organizations established in 1868
1868 establishments in Missouri
Organizations disestablished in 1956
1956 disestablishments in the United States